Machaeraptenus is a genus of moths in the family Erebidae. The genus was erected by William Schaus in 1894.

Species
Machaeraptenus crocopera (Schaus, 1905)
Machaeraptenus ventralis Schaus, 1894
Machaeraptenus yepezi Toulgoët & Watson, [1985]

References

Phaegopterina
Moth genera